"Eyes Closed" is a song by American singer Halsey. It was released on May 4, 2017, through Astralwerks as the first promotional single from her second studio album, Hopeless Fountain Kingdom (2017).

Background
Halsey announced on March 7, 2017, the release month and title of her second studio album Hopeless Fountain Kingdom, set for release in June. About the album's sound, she opted for a more mainstream-oriented sound, saying: "I am more than capable of writing radio music and hopefully I'll put my money where my mouth is on this album." The song was premiered on May 4, 2017, on Apple Music's Beats 1 along an interview with host Zane Lowe and director Baz Luhrmann, being later released on digital retailers and streaming platforms.

Rosé version

On February 10, 2019, Blackpink's Rosé released a cover of the song. It was written by Benny Blanco, Happy Perez, Halsey, The Weeknd and vocals from a Korean-New Zealand singer Rosé.

Composition
The track was written by Halsey and The Weeknd and the song's producers Benny Blanco, Cashmere Cat and Happy Perez. It has been described as dark and sinister-sounding synth-y electro. The song is written in C-sharp minor with a tempo of 65 beats per minute.

Critical reception
Da'Shan Smith of Billboard described the song as a "pop flavoring with an upbeat instrumental that falls in line with electro-soft rock" and "a more cinematic, ballad". PopCrush staff writers calls "Eyes Closed", "moody, chill-inducing".

Charts

Certifications

References

2010s ballads
2017 songs
Astralwerks singles
Capitol Records singles
Electropop ballads
Halsey (singer) songs
Songs written by Halsey (singer)
Songs written by Benny Blanco
Songs written by Cashmere Cat
Songs written by Happy Perez
Songs written by the Weeknd
Song recordings produced by Benny Blanco
Song recordings produced by Cashmere Cat